The 2022 Sydney SuperNight (know for commercial purpose as the 2022 Beaurepaires Sydney SuperNight) was a motor racing event held as a part of the 2022 Supercars Championship from Saturday 5 March to Sunday 6 March 2022. The event was held at the Sydney Motorsport Park in Eastern Creek, New South Wales. It was the first round of the 2022 Supercars Championship and consisted of two races of 300 kilometres.

Results

Race 1

Race 2

Championship standings after the race

Drivers' Championship standings

Teams'' Championship standings

 Note: Only the top five positions are included for both sets of standings.

References

Sydney SuperNight
Sydney SuperNight